Ákos Tulipán (born 16 November 1990) is a Hungarian professional footballer who plays for Dorogi FC.

Club statistics

Updated to games played as of 1 June 2014.

References

HLSZ 

1990 births
Living people
Sportspeople from Eger
Hungarian footballers
Association football goalkeepers
Vasas SC players
Budaörsi SC footballers
Bajai LSE footballers
Ferencvárosi TC footballers
FC Ajka players
Ceglédi VSE footballers
Dorogi FC footballers
Nemzeti Bajnokság I players